Thankgod Amaefule (born 16 December 1984 in Port Harcourt) is a Nigerian footballer who last played for Heartland F.C.

Amaefule joined Dolphins F.C. in the summer of 2007, after playing several seasons in Poland and Greece, including Veria FC in the Greek second level. He was excluded from the remainder of Dolphins' 2008 Confederation Cup campaign because of insubordination and inciting disunity. He transferred to crosstown rival Sharks and was a part of their run to the FA Cup final. He played his only match for Nigeria on 3 March 2010 against Congo DR.

External links
 
 
 Dolphins coach shuts door against dropped player
 Federation Cup live stats (Kickoff Nigeria)

1984 births
Living people
Sportspeople from Port Harcourt
Association football forwards
Nigerian footballers
Nigeria international footballers
Nigerian expatriate footballers
Expatriate footballers in Greece
Nigerian expatriate sportspeople in Greece
Expatriate footballers in Poland
Nigerian expatriate sportspeople in Poland
Jeziorak Iława players
Okęcie Warsaw players
PAOK FC players
Veria F.C. players
Sharks F.C. players
Dolphin F.C. (Nigeria) players
Heartland F.C. players